The Revealed Sermon or (Arabic:Khutba Ilhamiyya) was a sermon delivered by Mirza Ghulam Ahmad, the founder of the Ahmadiyya movement, on April 11, 1900 for the festival of Eid ul-Adha. The hour-long sermon, transcribed by Maulvi Nurud Deen and Maulvi Abdul Karim at Ahmad's request, focused on the philosophy of sacrifice. The sermon is considered a divine revelation to Ahmadi Muslims.

Background

After the Eid prayers,  Hakim Nur-ud-Din and  Maulvi Abdul Karim, two of the companions of Ahmad, were asked to sit near Ahmad and were asked to record the speech to be delivered in Arabic word for word. After the Eid sermon was finished, Maulavi ‘Abdul Karim delivered a summary of the sermon in the Urdu language. While the summary was being delivered it is reported that Ahmad performed Sajdah (prostration) in order to show a sudden sense of gratitude to God. This was followed by the gathering. Ahmad saw a vision and after the sajdah told his people that he had just read the word Mubarak (congratulations) written in scarlet.
 
Ahmad wrote later:

Contents

The book comprises two parts. The first part is the actual sermon and the second part which was written later by Mirza Ghulam Ahmad discusses the philosophy of sacrifice and the advent of the promised messiah in the light of the Qur'an and the Hadith.

References

Works by Mirza Ghulam Ahmad
1900 speeches
1900 in religion
20th-century Islam
1900s in Islam